Joe Thomas (born 29 January 1988 in Pontypridd) is Welsh athlete specializing in the middle-distance events. He competed at the 2012 World Indoor Championships reaching the semifinals. In June 2014 he was diagnosed with Crohn's disease.

Competition record

Personal bests
Outdoor
800 m – 1:46.20 (Oordegem 2008)
1000 m – 2:19.91 (Gateshead 2008)

Indoor
800 m – 1:46.33 (Stockholm 2012)

See also
 List of people diagnosed with Crohn's disease

References

External links
 
Welsh Athletics profile for Joe Thomas

1988 births
Living people
Welsh male middle-distance runners
Athletes (track and field) at the 2010 Commonwealth Games
Athletes (track and field) at the 2014 Commonwealth Games
Commonwealth Games competitors for Wales
Sportspeople from Pontypridd
People with Crohn's disease